Chalcis or Chalkis was a town of ancient Epirus in Mount Pindus, near which the Achelous River rises. It is erroneously called by Stephanus of Byzantium a town of Aetolia.

Its site is tentatively identified as near Khaliki.

References

Populated places in ancient Epirus
Former populated places in Greece